Mikael Fredriksson (born 15 October 1990) is a Swedish retired Paralympic swimmer who competed at international swimming competitions. He is three-time World and European medalist, he has also competed at the 2012 and 2016 Summer Paralympics but did not medal.

References

1990 births
Living people
People from Lindesberg Municipality
Paralympic swimmers of Sweden
Swedish male freestyle swimmers
Swedish male backstroke swimmers
Swedish male medley swimmers
Swimmers at the 2012 Summer Paralympics
Swimmers at the 2016 Summer Paralympics
Medalists at the World Para Swimming Championships
Medalists at the World Para Swimming European Championships
S3-classified Paralympic swimmers